Dr. Susan E. Borrego was the second woman chancellor and eighth chancellor of the University of Michigan–Flint. Currently, Borrego is a tenured professor at the University of Michigan–Flint School of Education and Human Services.

Personal life
Borrego was raised in Detroit. Her career has been driven by a dedication to student success that was inspired by her own ability to see what a difference higher education can make, should make, and does make in students’ lives. Borrego received her Bachelor of Arts in speech and communication from Northwest Nazarene College, Master of Arts in Social Science: Student Development from Azusa Pacific University, and her Ph.D. in Education from Claremont Graduate School. Borrego and her partner, Mary Boyce, Ph.D., are the parents of two adult children and eight grandchildren.

Education
Borrego received her Bachelor of Arts degree in speech and communication from Northwest Nazarene College. She went on to receive a Master of Arts in Social Science: Student Development from Azusa Pacific University, and her Ph.D. in education from Claremont Graduate School.

Academic career
Dr. Susan E. Borrego had been in Higher Education for nearly 30 years. Prior to being appointed chancellor, Borrego served as the vice president for enrollment management, planning, and student affairs at California State University, Dominguez Hills.  Borrego had been vice president for student affairs at California State University, Monterey Bay, and assistant vice chancellor for student affairs and associate vice chancellor/dean of students at the University of Arkansas. She served at California Institute of Technology during the 1990s where she developed the university's first high-achievement program for under-represented students.

On April 17, 2014, she was approved by the Board of Regents of the University of Michigan as the eighth chancellor of the University of Michigan–Flint, beginning a five-year appointment on August 1, 2014.  Currently, Borrego is a tenured faculty at the University of Michigan–Flint School of Education and Human Services.

External links
Official website of Chancellor of the University of Michigan–Flint

References

University of Michigan–Flint people
Living people
Northwest Nazarene University alumni
Claremont Graduate University alumni
Azusa Pacific University alumni
People from Detroit
People from Flint, Michigan
University of Arkansas people
California Institute of Technology people
Year of birth missing (living people)